Anomoeotes leucolena is a species of moth of the Anomoeotidae family. It is known from Angola, Cameroon, Equatorial Guinea, Gabon and Sierra Leone.

References

Anomoeotidae
Moths of Africa
Moths described in 1893